The following lists of tourist attractions include tourist attractions in various countries.

By type

 List of airshows
 List of amusement parks
 List of aquaria
 List of beaches
 List of botanical gardens
 List of buildings
 List of casino hotels
 List of casinos
 List of castles
 List of festivals
 List of forts
 List of gardens
 List of heritage railways
 List of memorials
 List of monuments
 List of museums
 List of most visited art museums in the world
 List of national parks
 List of Renaissance fairs
 List of shopping malls
 List of ski areas and resorts
 List of sports facilities
 List of indoor arenas
 List of motor racing tracks
 List of stadia
 List of tennis venues
 List of velodromes
 List of tourist attractions providing reenactment
 List of World Heritage Sites
 List of zoos
 See also: :Category:Nature reserves
 Tourist traps

Tall buildings and structures
 List of tallest buildings and structures in the world
 List of tallest buildings in the world
 List of tallest freestanding structures in the world
 List of tallest structures in the world
 List of tallest towers in the world
 Observation decks

By country

Algeria
 Tourism in Algeria

Australia

 List of attractions in Brisbane
 List of attractions in Sydney
 Attractions in Victor Harbor, South Australia

Austria

 Category: Tourist attractions in Austria
 List of World Heritage Sites in Austria
 Tourist attractions in Vienna

Azerbaijan

 Category: Tourist attractions in Azerbaijan
 List of World Heritage Sites in Azerbaijan
 List of tourist attractions in Baku

Botswana
 Visitor attractions in Botswana

Brazil

 List of attractions in Brazil

Bulgaria

Cambodia

Canada

China

 List of landmarks in Beijing
 List of attractions in Shanghai
 World Heritage Sites in China

Colombia
 

 List of national parks of Colombia

Croatia

Denmark

 List of tourist attractions in Denmark

Egypt

 Tourism in Egypt

Finland

 List of tourist attractions in Helsinki

France

 List of tourist attractions in Paris

Georgia

Germany

 List of sights in Berlin
 List of sights of Potsdam
 List of castles in Germany
 List of cathedrals in Germany
 List of museums in Germany
 List of tallest structures in Germany

Greece

 List of museums in Greece
 List of Archaeological sites in Greece

Hong Kong

 List of museums in Hong Kong

Hungary

 List of tourist attractions in Budapest
 List of national parks of Hungary
 List of World Heritage Sites in Hungary

India

Tourism in Tamil Nadu
 Tourism in Chennai 
 List of tourist attractions in Delhi 
Tourism in Telangana
 List of tourist attractions in Hyderabad
 Tourism in Andhra Pradesh
 List of tourist attractions and events in Visakhapatnam
 List of tourist attractions in Vijayawada
 Tourism in Karnataka
 List of tourist attractions in Bangalore 
 Tourist attractions in Mysore 
 Tourism in Madhya Pradesh
 Tourism in Jharkhand
 Tourist attractions in West Bengal
 Places of interest in Kolkata
 Tourism in Uttarakhand
 Tourism in Kerala
 Tourism in Thiruvananthapuram
 List of tourist attractions in Kochi
 Tourism in Gujarat
 Tourism in Bihar
 Tourism in Goa
 Tourism in Himachal Pradesh
 Tourism in Jammu and Kashmir
Tourism in Ladakh
 Tourism in Haryana
 Tourism in Rajasthan
 Tourism in Uttar Pradesh
 List of tourist attractions in Allahabad

Indonesia
 Tourism in Indonesia

Iran

 Visitor attractions in Isfahan
 Visitor attractions in Kermanshah
 Visitor attractions in Shiraz
 Visitor attractions of Tabriz
 Visitor attractions in Tehran
 Zagros Paleolithic Museum
 Visitor Attractions of Yazd
 Visitor Attractions of Khuzestan 
 Visitor Attractions of Kerman

Ireland

Israel

 List of Israeli museums
 National parks and nature reserves of Israel

Italy

 List of tourist attractions in Rome
 List of tourist attractions in Sardinia

Jamaica
 

 List of beaches in Jamaica

Japan

 Groups of Traditional Buildings
 Japanese museums
 Japan's Top 100 Castles
 List of castles in Japan
 List of lakes of Japan
 List of museums in Japan
 List of National Geoparks in Japan
 List of national parks of Japan
 List of Special Places of Scenic Beauty, Special Historic Sites and Special Natural Monuments
 World Heritage Sites in Japan
 National Treasures of Japan
 Three Views of Japan
 Tourism in Tokyo

Jordan

 Main tourist destinations in Jordan

Kenya
 Visitor attractions in Kenya

Kuwait
 Tourism in Kuwait

Lebanon

 Tourism in Lebanon

Macau

 List of museums in Macau

Madagascar
 Tourist attractions in Madagascar

Morocco
 Tourism in Morocco

Nepal
Nepal is the country where Mount Everest, the highest mountain peak in the world, is located. Mountaineering and other types of adventure tourism and ecotourism are important attractions for visitors. The world heritage site Lumbini, birthplace of Gautama Buddha, is located in southern Nepal, and there are other important religious pilgrimage sites throughout the country. 

Tourism in Nepal

Netherlands
 List of tourist attractions in Amsterdam

New Zealand

 Auckland
 List of World Heritage Sites in New Zealand

Nicaragua
 Tourist attractions in Nicaragua

North Korea
 List of tourist attractions in Pyongyang

Pakistan

Archaeological sites in Pakistan
Biosphere reserves of Pakistan
List of barrages and headworks in Pakistan
List of beaches in Pakistan
List of birds of Pakistan
List of botanical gardens in Pakistan
List of bridges in Pakistan
List of cathedrals in Pakistan
List of caves in Pakistan
List of dams and reservoirs in Pakistan
List of endangered species in Pakistan
List of faults in Pakistan
List of festivals in Pakistan
List of forts in Pakistan
List of glaciers of Pakistan
List of hydroelectric power stations in Pakistan
List of lakes of Pakistan
List of mammals of Pakistan
List of mausolea and shrines in Pakistan
List of minerals of Pakistan
List of mosques in Pakistan
List of museums in Pakistan
List of mountain passes in Pakistan
List of mountains in Pakistan
List of national monuments of Pakistan
List of national parks of Pakistan
List of parks and gardens in Pakistan
List of rivers of Pakistan
 List of Shiva Temples in Pakistan
List of shopping malls in Pakistan
List of stadiums in Pakistan
List of Pakistani sweets and desserts
List of valleys in Pakistan
List of waterfalls of Pakistan
List of World Heritage Sites in Pakistan
List of zoos in Pakistan
Tourism in Azad Jammu & Kashmir
Tourism in Balochistan
Tourism in Gilgit-Baltistan
List of tourist attractions in Islamabad
Tourism in Khyber Pakhtunkhwa
Tourism in Punjab, Pakistan
List of tourist sites in Lahore
List of parks and gardens in Lahore
Tourism in Sindh
Tourism in Karachi
List of tourist attractions in Karachi
List of parks and gardens in Karachi

Papua New Guinea
Attractions in Papua New Guinea

Philippines
Tourist attraction in the Philippines

Poland

Tourism in Poland
Tourist attractions in Warsaw

Portugal

List of World Heritage Sites in Portugal
Christ the King statue in Almada
Sanctuary of Our Lady in Fátima
Marinha Beach in Lagoa, Algarve

Russia
List of Moscow tourist attractions
Landmarks of Saint Petersburg

Singapore

List of tourist attractions in Singapore

South Africa

List of tourist attractions in South Africa

South Korea
List of South Korean tourist attractions

Spain

List of national parks of Spain
List of World Heritage Sites in Spain

Sri Lanka
Visitor attractions in Sri Lanka

Switzerland

Lists of tourist attractions in Switzerland

Taiwan

 List of museums in Taiwan
 List of tourist attractions in Taipei
 List of tourist attractions in Taiwan

Thailand

Tourism in Bangkok
List of national parks of Thailand
World Heritage Sites in Thailand

Tunisia
Attractions in Tunisia

Turkey
 Attractions in Turkey

Ukraine

 List of museums in Ukraine
 List of World Heritage Sites in Ukraine

United Arab Emirates
 List of tourist attractions in the United Arab Emirates

United Kingdom

United States

 List of heritage railroads in the United States
 List of botanical gardens and arboretums in the United States
 List of museums in the United States
 Art museums

Uruguay

Venezuela

See also

Vacation spot (disambiguation)
Landmark